The Aaro Kivilinna Memorial Trophy is an award given every year since 1973 to the best ice hockey club overall in Finland by the Finnish SM-liiga. The recipient is determined by the final standings of each club in the SM-liiga or Mestis as well as their teams in the three topmost junior leagues and the women's league. (Thus the winner is quite often another club than the SM-liiga champion of that year.)

Aaro Kivilinna was an ice hockey defenseman from Helsinki, Finland who also worked as a sports journalist and as the secretary and later vice-president of the Finnish Ice Hockey Association. He was killed in action in the Winter War in February 1940.

Winners of the Aaro Kivilinna Memorial Trophy

References

Liiga trophies and awards